Meropleon is a genus of moths of the family Noctuidae.

Species
 Meropleon ambifusca (Newman, 1948)
 Meropleon cinnamicolor Ferguson, 1982
 Meropleon cosmion Dyar, 1924
 Meropleon diversicolor (Morrison, 1875)
 Meropleon linae Metlevski, 2005
 Meropleon titan Todd, 1958

References
 Metlevski, J. (2005). "Contribution to the taxonomy and faunistics of the Genus Meropleon Dyar (Lepidoptera: Noctuidae)." Proceedings of the Entomological Society of Washington 107(4): 812-819. 
 Natural History Museum Lepidoptera genus database
 Meropleon at funet

Hadeninae
Moth genera